Carbonicola is an extinct genus of saltwater clams, marine bivalve mollusks that lived during the Carboniferous period.

References
 Fossils (Smithsonian Handbooks) by David Ward (Page 103)

External links 
 

Prehistoric bivalve genera
Carboniferous bivalves
Carboniferous molluscs of Europe
Venerida